The Campeonato Argentino de Rugby 1977 was won by the selection of the U.R.B.A. (Buenos Aires) that beat in the final the selection of Unión de Rugby de Rosario

Rugby Union in Argentina in 1977

National
 The Buenos Aires Champsionship was won by San Isidro Club
 The Cordoba Province Championship was won by Universitario
 The North-East Championship was won by Lawn Tennis and Tucumán RC

International 
In June came in Argentina the France national rugby union team for a seven matches tour with two test matches with "Pumas" . A victory for French and a Drew the results.

Preliminaries

Zone 1

Zone 2

Zone 3

Zone 4

Interzone

Semifinals 
 Score system: Try= 4 points, Conversion=2 points . Penalty and kick from mark= 3 points. Drop= 3 points. 

 Cuyo: R. Muñiz, O. Morales, O. Terranova, E. Terranova, G. Morgan, P. Guarrochena, Chacón, J. Nasazzi, G. Antonini, J. Navessi (cap.), A. Cattáneo, E. Casale, R. Irañeta, Cichitti, González. 
Rosario: D. Baetti, A. Nogués, H. Romero Acuña, E. Bracalenti, D. Giner, M. Dip, R. Castagna, V. Macat, R. Seaton, R. Imhoff, M. Chesta, G. Sinópoli, P. Sandionigi, J. Costante (cap.), E.Pavani 

 Noreste : C. Palmetler, R. Molina, D. Romero, R. Taborda, M. González, C. Salvi, J. Pérez González (capt.), E. Giménez, J. Domínguez, J. Feliciani, L. Colignon, M. Abraham, D. D'Elía, D. Feuerman, M. Freschi. 
Buenos Aires M. Alonso, A. Cappelletti, J. Trucco, G. Beccar Varela, J. Gauweloose, J. Capalbo, M. Devoto, F. Bustillo, M. Correa, A. Voltán, R. Sanz, J. Fernández (capt.), D. Chimondegui, R. Mastai, H. Mazzini.

Third place final

Final

  Rosario: D. Baetti, A. Nogués, F. Bracalenti, H. Romero Acuña, D. Giner, M. Dip, R. Castagna, V. Macat, R. Seaton, R. lmhoff, M. Chesta, C. Suetaz, D. Poet, J. Costante (cap.), E. Pavani.
 Buenos Aires: M. Alonso, G. Alvarez, L. Balfour, A. Cappelletti, J. Gauweloose, G. Beccar Varela, R. Landajo, R. Sanz, H. Mazzini, R. Mastai, J. Fernández (capt.), S. lachetti, R. Ventura, J. Braceras, F. Bustillo.

References 
Memorias de la UAR 1977
 Francesco Volpe, Paolo Pacitti (Author), Rugby 2000, GTE Gruppo Editorale (1999)

Campeonato Argentino de Rugby
Argentina